Mark Parent (born August 25, 1954) is a Canadian clergyman, author, academic, and former politician in Nova Scotia.

Parent is the son of Baptist missionaries Hazen Coles Parent and Hazel Mildred Anderson.  Parent was raised in Bolivia, South America before returning to Canada for post secondary studies. He holds a Bachelor of Arts degree from York University, a Master of Divinity from Acadia Divinity College, and a Doctor of Philosophy from McGill University.

Parent is married to his second wife Margie Jenkins and together they have five grown children. His first wife, Cathy, died in 1998.

Parent served in various churches in Ontario, New Brunswick and Nova Scotia before returning home in 1994 to serve as pastor of the Pereaux United Baptist Church.  During the late 1990s he was an associate professor of Religious Studies at Mount Allison University.

Political career

In 1997, Parent volunteered as the Policy Chair for the Progressive Conservative Party of Nova Scotia.

In 1999 Parent successfully ran for the Progressive Conservative nomination in the riding of Kings North.  He was elected in the 1999 provincial election with 49.05% of the vote.

As a legislator, Parent became known for speaking frankly both in the House of Assembly and to the media, and expressed dissatisfaction with how the legislature conducted its business.

Parent was re-elected in the 2003 provincial election with 50.2%.  In the 2006 election, Parent was re-elected with 50.07%.

In 2006 Parent was appointed to the Executive Council of Nova Scotia where he served as Minister of Environment and Labour.  While Minister, Parent oversaw the division of the Department of Environment and Labour into two portfolios in April 2008, consisting of a separate Department of Environment and a separate Department of Labour and Workforce Development. Parent served as Minister for those portfolios until January 2009, when he was appointed Minister of Agriculture, just days before he was to release Nova Scotia's climate change plan. During his time in cabinet, Parent was also responsible for Part II of the Gambling Control Act, the Workers' Compensation Act (except Part II) and the Apprenticeship and Trades Qualifications Act.

Parent was defeated in the 2009 provincial election, with 36.08% of the vote in his riding.

Electoral record

Federal

Provincial

|-

|New Democrat
|Jim Morton
|align="right"|3,535
|align="right"|41.43
|align="right"|
|-

|Progressive Conservative
|Mark Parent
|align="right"|3,079
|align="right"|36.08
|align="right"|
|-

|Liberal
|Shirley Fisher
|align="right"|1,541
|align="right"|18.06
|align="right"|
|-

|}

|Progressive Conservative
|Mark Parent
|align="right"|4153
|align="right"|50.07
|-

|New Democrat
|Jim Morton
|align="right"|2190
|align="right"|26.40
|-

|Liberal
|Madonna Spinazola
|align="right"|1757
|align="right"|21.18

|-

|Progressive Conservative
|Mark Parent
|align="right"|4063
|align="right"|50.2
|align="right"|
|-

|New Democrat
|Jim Morton
|align="right"|2340
|align="right"|29.91
|align="right"|
|-

|Liberal
|Michael Landry
|align="right"|1533
|align="right"|18.94
|align="right"|
|-

|}

|-

|Progressive Conservative
|Mark Parent
|align="right"|4321
|align="right"|49.05
|align="right"|
|-

|New Democrat
|Neil H. McNeil
|align="right"|2513
|align="right"|28.53
|align="right"|
|-

|Liberal
|Peter Hill
|align="right"|1975
|align="right"|22.42
|align="right"|
|}

Bibliography

References

External links
 Mark Parent's website

1954 births
Living people
Canadian non-fiction writers
Conservative Party of Canada candidates for the Canadian House of Commons
Writers from Nova Scotia
People from Kings County, Nova Scotia
Progressive Conservative Association of Nova Scotia MLAs
Members of the Executive Council of Nova Scotia
York University alumni
Acadia University alumni
McGill University alumni
Academic staff of Mount Allison University
21st-century Canadian politicians